Peter Tim Dirk "Pim" Verbeek (12 March 1956 – 28 November 2019) was a Dutch football manager who last coached the Oman national football team.

Playing career
As a player, Verbeek was a defender or a midfielder and spent his entire career at Sparta Rotterdam. He played there for two stints: from 1974 to 1975 and from 1977 to 1980.

Managerial career

South Korea
Verbeek was the assistant coach of the South Korean national team under Guus Hiddink at the 2002 FIFA World Cup and also under Dick Advocaat at the 2006 FIFA World Cup. Prior to this, he coached various teams in his home country, including De Graafschap, Groningen, Fortuna Sittard and even Feyenoord. He also served as the assistant coach of the United Arab Emirates national team.

Verbeek began coaching South Korea on 26 June 2006. He led South Korea to a third-place finish at the 2007 AFC Asian Cup, guaranteeing them automatic qualification to the next tournament. He left in July 2007.

Australia
Verbeek was linked to coaching the Australian national team after he stated that he would welcome another job in Asia. He had previously been linked with the Socceroos in 2005. On 6 December 2007, it was announced that Verbeek had secured his position as Australia's coach. In his first World Cup qualifying match as head coach, he led Australia to a 3-0 win against Qatar at home.

Verbeek's poor opinion of the standard of the A-League was well-known, describing the performances of locally-based players Archie Thompson and Danny Allsopp against Indonesia as "absolutely hopeless" and openly questioning the decision of Jason Culina to leave PSV Eindhoven and return home to play in Australia. When asked about possible improvements for the quality of football in the A-League, he said "Do you have an hour?" and "I am just being honest."

Under Verbeek, the Socceroos were the second country (apart from the hosts) to qualify for the 2010 FIFA World Cup after a 0-0 draw against Qatar in June 2009, less than an hour after Japan had qualified.

Australia lost 0-4 to Germany in their opening match of the 2010 World Cup. In that match, Verbeek chose to start the match without a recognised striker. He was heavily criticised by the Australian media for refusing to play attacking players Josh Kennedy, Mark Bresciano and Harry Kewell, all of whom were proven goal-scorers at international level. Australia then drew 1-1 with Ghana and defeated Serbia 2-1. They ended their group with four points, equal with Ghana, but finished only third due to a worse goal difference and were eliminated, with Verbeek departing shortly after. Ghana went on to reach the quarter-finals, becoming one of only three African teams to do so at a World Cup.

Morocco
On 8 April 2010, Verbeek was appointed as the technical director for Morocco's youth teams. His primary role was to identify and develop young talents for the Moroccan national team, which had failed to qualify for the World Cup finals and the Africa Cup of Nations in 2010.

He helped establish a new generation that would be considered as the best Moroccan side in the 21st century by nurturing a young, talented squad. At the 2011 CAF U-23 Championship on home soil, Verbeek's U-23 team became runners-up, overcoming many giants like Algeria and Egypt. This success earned Morocco qualification to the 2012 Summer Olympics, in which Verbeek was praised. Although the Atlas Lions could not succeed in a tough group, a number of players became noticed by the world, such as Nordin Amrabat and Yassine Bounou, who would go on to represent Morocco at the 2018 FIFA World Cup. After the Olympics, Verbeek left Morocco.

Many of Verbeek’s talents would form the backbone of the Moroccan squad that reached the Semi Finals of the 2022 FIFA World Cup, becoming the first African side to do so.

Oman
He was appointed as the Omani national team's coach in 2016 after their failure to qualify for the 2018 FIFA World Cup. Under his guidance, many young talented players emerged, in which Oman would eventually win the 23rd Arabian Gulf Cup held in Kuwait, which was also the country's second ever Gulf Cup and Verbeek's first ever international trophy.

However, it was the 2019 AFC Asian Cup that became Verbeek's biggest success in his coaching career. Despite losing to Uzbekistan and Japan by a single goal, Oman defeated Turkmenistan 3-1, reaching the knockout stages for the first time ever. It became the greatest success in the history of Omani football. After Oman's Asian Cup journey ended in the round of 16 with a 2-0 loss to Iran, Verbeek announced that he would retire from coaching for good.

Return to Sparta Rotterdam
On 12 February 2019, Sparta Rotterdam announced that they had reached an agreement with Verbeek about joining the club as a member of the board. He held that position until his death.

Managerial style
Verbeek usually employed two holding midfielders and a sole striker up front. His teams usually played conservatively with a slow tempo, built up play gradually and heavily relied on crosses and team passes.

Personal life and death
Verbeek's brother Robert is also a football coach. However, they are not related to yet another coach, Gertjan Verbeek, who also coached Feyenoord.

He died on 28 November 2019 at 63, after a four-year battle with cancer.

Managerial statistics

References

External links

1956 births
2019 deaths
Eredivisie players
Footballers from Rotterdam
Dutch footballers
Dutch football managers
Dutch expatriate football managers
Sparta Rotterdam players
Sparta Rotterdam managers
De Graafschap managers
Feyenoord managers
J1 League managers
J2 League managers
Omiya Ardija managers
Kyoto Sanga FC managers
Expatriate soccer managers in Australia
Expatriate football managers in Japan
Expatriate football managers in South Korea
Australian soccer coaches
Australia national soccer team managers
2007 AFC Asian Cup managers
2010 FIFA World Cup managers
Expatriate football managers in the Netherlands Antilles
Netherlands Antilles national football team managers
South Korea national football team managers
FC Groningen managers
Dutch expatriate sportspeople in South Korea
Dutch expatriate sportspeople in Morocco
2019 AFC Asian Cup managers
Association football midfielders
Expatriate football managers in Morocco
Dutch expatriate sportspeople in Germany
Dutch expatriate sportspeople in the United Arab Emirates
Dutch expatriate sportspeople in Oman
Expatriate football managers in Oman
Oman national football team managers